M. maculata may refer to:

 Mabuya maculata (Demerara), a Guyanese skink
 Mabuya maculata (Fernando de Noronha), a Brazilian skink
 Macrocallista maculata, a bivalve mollusc
 Macrothele maculata, a mygalomorph spider
 Maculatoscelis maculata, a praying mantis
 Madecassina maculata, a ground beetle
 Mancopsetta maculata, a southern flounder
 Medicago maculata, a plant native to the Mediterranean Basin
 Megascolia maculata, a scoliid wasp
 Megilla maculata, a ladybird beetle
 Mahehia maculata, a woodlouse endemic to Seychelles
 Margarita maculata, a sea snail
 Melanoraphia maculata, a ringed worm
 Mene maculata, a disk-shaped fish
 Mesovipera maculata, a venomous viper
 Mitromorpha maculata, a sea snail
 Mormodes maculata, an orchid endemic to Mexico
 Musca maculata, a European fly
 Mycena maculata, a saprotrophic fungus
 Myopopone maculata, a social insect